Henry John Denham Arkell was an English first-class cricketer. He played in two first-class matches for Northamptonshire in 1921.

His son Myles played first-class cricket for Cambridge University.

References

English cricketers
Northamptonshire cricketers
1898 births
1982 deaths